National Highway 105B, commonly referred to as NH 105B is a national highway in  India. It is a spur road of National Highway 5 in the state of Punjab in India.

Route 
Moga-Bagha Purana-Bajakhana

Junctions 

                        
 near Bagapurana

 near Bajakhana

See also 
 List of National Highways in India
 List of National Highways in Punjab, India
 List of National Highways in India by state

References  

National highways in India
National Highways in Punjab, India